Mansfield Senior High School is located in Mansfield, Ohio, United States.  The school serves grades 7-12 and is part of the Mansfield City School District. The school enrolls 1,389 students as of the 2006–2007 academic year. Their nickname is the Tygers.

Ohio High School Athletic Association State Championships

 Boys Baseball – 1954
 Boys Track and Field – 1945, 1978

Notable alumnus
 Lee Adams — Tony Award-winning lyricist and member of the Songwriters Hall of Fame
 Sherrod Brown — U.S. Senator representing Ohio
 Hugh Douglas — American football defensive end in the National Football League and football analyst for the ESPN television network
 Keon Johnson — basketball player (Winthrop Eagles)
 John Robinson — Washington State Supreme Court justice
 H. Edwin Umbarger — bacteriologist, biochemist, and member of the National Academy of Sciences

External links
 Mansfield City Schools—TygerPride.com
 Mansfield Senior High School profile—GreatSchools.net
 Mansfield City Schools profile—City-Data.com

References

Buildings and structures in Mansfield, Ohio
High schools in Richland County, Ohio
Public high schools in Ohio